Lady Nina is a song by the British neo-progressive rock band Marillion. First released in 1985 on the B-side to the #2 UK hit single "Kayleigh", it was the only single from the EP Brief Encounter released in the United States by Capitol Records in April 1986. A music video was also shot to promote it. While the EP climbed to #67 on the Billboard 200 album charts, "Lady Nina" did not make the Billboard Hot 100, but did reach #30 on the Mainstream Rock charts.

The song is about a prostitute. "Lady Nina" is the only Marillion song to use a drum machine throughout. The cover was designed by regular Marillion collaborator Mark Wilkinson. The third European single from the Misplaced Childhood album, "Heart of Lothian", featured as the B-side.

The regular 7" single featured an edited version of the title track with a playing time of 03:39; this version was identical to the one found on the b-side of the "Kayleigh" 7" single. No other versions were officially released. However, a 12" promo was sent out to radio stations which featured the extended version (5:45) (originally released on the 12" version of "Kayleigh") on side A and the edited version on side B. The extended version was also the one included on Brief Encounter.

Being a U.S.-only single, "Lady Nina" was not part of the collectors box-set released in July 2000 and was re-issued as a 3-CD set in 2009 (see The Singles '82–88'); however, both tracks of this single are included as they featured on the singles "Kayleigh" and "Heart of Lothian".

Track list

Side A
 Lady Nina 03:39 (Dick/Rothery/Kelly/Trewavas/Mosley)

Side B
 Heart of Lothian 03:47 (Dick/Rothery/Kelly/Trewavas/Mosley)

Personnel
Fish – vocals
Steve Rothery – guitars
Mark Kelly – keyboards
Pete Trewavas – bass
Ian Mosley – drum machine programming

References 

1986 singles
1985 songs
Capitol Records singles
Marillion songs
Song recordings produced by Chris Kimsey
Songs about prostitutes
Songs written by Fish (singer)
Songs written by Mark Kelly (keyboardist)
Songs written by Ian Mosley
Songs written by Pete Trewavas
Songs written by Steve Rothery